Studies in Microeconomics is a peer-reviewed journal that provides a forum for discussion on all areas of microeconomics.

It is published twice in a year by SAGE Publications.

Abstracting and indexing 
Studies in Microeconomics is abstracted and indexed in:
 DeepDyve
 Dutch-KB
 CCC
 J-Gate
 ProQuest: Worldwide Political Science Abstracts
 UGC-CARE : Consortium for Academic Research and Ethics
 Scopus

References

 http://publicationethics.org/members/studies-microeconomics

External links
 
 Homepage

SAGE Publishing academic journals
Biannual journals
Economics journals
Publications established in 2013